The Perfect Guy, also titled Jeanne and the Perfect Guy, is a 1998 French romantic musical drama film directed by Olivier Ducastel and Jacques Martineau. It was entered into the 48th Berlin International Film Festival.

Cast
 Virginie Ledoyen as Jeanne
 Mathieu Demy as Olivier
 Jacques Bonnaffé as François
 Valérie Bonneton as Sophie
 Frédéric Gorny as Jean-Baptiste
 Denis Podalydès as Julien

Reception
Review aggregation website Rotten Tomatoes reported an approval rating of 60%, based on 5 reviews, with an average score of 5.8/10.

Accolades

References

External links

1998 films
1998 romantic drama films
1990s romantic musical films
1990s French-language films
French romantic musical films
French romantic drama films
Films directed by Olivier Ducastel
Films directed by Jacques Martineau
1990s French films